Fyrsjøen ("The Lighthouse Lake") is a lake in Nordenskiöld Land at Spitsbergen, Svalbard. It is located at the southern part of the headland Kapp Linné, proximate to the Isfjord Lighthouse. 

The area between Fyrsjøen and the bay of Randvika is protected as the Kapp Linné Bird Sanctuary.

References

Lakes of Spitsbergen